Betina González (born 1972) is an Argentine writer.

Biography
Born in the Greater Buenos Aires metro area, she studied Social Communications at the University of Buenos Aires, where she worked as a professor and a researcher. In 2003 she moved to Texas to pursue an M.F.A. in creative writing at the University of Texas at El Paso. She graduated in 2006. The same year, Arte menor, her first novel, won the Clarín Annual Literary Prize for novels, one of the most important literary awards in Latin America. The book was listed among the Argentine best sellers of that year.

Arte menor, a story of a daughter in search of her father’s elusive figure memory, was defined by Rosa Montero as a "A fascinating work of magic about identity and imagination, about filial love and the uncertainness of life." Eduardo Belgrano Rawson characterized the novel as a "detective story written with humor and intelligence about a daughter determined to solve the mystery of her father." José Saramago considered that Betina Gonzalez had demonstrated, through her sense of proportion and balance, a "real command of such a complex genre as the novel." "Of this novel, Arte menor, it can be said that only in its title is it ‘minor’ art. What comes after the title is certainly, a work of major art," stated the Portuguese author.

In 2006, the Argentine National Fund for the Arts awarded Betina González the second prize for Juegos de Playa, a collection of tales formed by a novella and four short stories. Juegos de Playa, the novella that gives title to the book, explores the fears and fantasies of a little girl during the 1982 Falkland War between Argentina and the United Kingdom.

Works
 Arte menor, Buenos Aires: Clarín-Alfaguara, December 2006 
 Juegos de playa, Buenos Aires: Clarín-Alfaguara. Nouvelle y cuentos, 2008, 
Las poseídas, Tusquets, January 2013, 
El amor es una catástrofe natural, Tusquets, January 2014, 
América alucinada, Tusquets, January 2013, ; English: American Delerium, trans. Heather Cleary, Henry Holt and Co., February 2021, .

See also
 Lists of writers

References

External links 
Official web: https://archive.today/20121130090722/http://betinagonzalezescritora.blogspot.com/ (in Spanish)
 "Escribo con rabia, con bronca, pero también con una inmensa, intransferible felicidad" Interview with Betina González "Revista Liberia" (in Spanish)
 "Ninguna vida tiene una versión definitiva" Interview with Betina González  Clarín
 "La pequeña odisea de una hija" Book review on Web  Página/12
 Article on the 2006 Argentine National Fund Award  Clarín

1972 births
Living people
People from Buenos Aires Province
Argentine people of Spanish descent
University of Buenos Aires alumni
University of Texas at El Paso alumni
Argentine women writers